Morningside Avenue is a suburban arterial road in Toronto, Ontario, Canada. It is entirely within Scarborough, running north by north-west from the Scarborough Bluffs overlooking Lake Ontario to the eastern terminus of McNicoll Avenue near the Rouge River valley.

It is not to be confused with Morningside Avenue, a minor residential road in the Toronto neighbourhood of Swansea.

Route description

The foot of Morningside is located at Guildwood Parkway on the shores of Lake Ontario, and traces the original Scarborough Township Lot 10 line north-east toward the commercial centre of the West Hill neighbourhood at Kingston Road. West Hill takes its name from its position above the broad valley of Highland Creek. The valley is the site of Morningside Park, one of Toronto's largest. Within the valley at the intersection of Ellesmere Road is the Morningside Campus of Centennial College and the Scarborough campus of the University of Toronto in which Morningside Avenue forms the western boundary of. Beyond the valley, which was the former northern terminus, the present route was named "Littles Road" after an early family in the area. Between Sheppard and Finch Avenues, Morningside serves as the eastern boundary of the Malvern neighbourhood. The route veers to the north-west north of Sheppard Avenue, skirting the ravine of Morningside Creek and Rouge Park.

Communities lining the northern reaches of the street, and those nearby across the city boundary in Markham, are constrained by the topographic and legislative boundaries of Rouge Park. A northern extension to Morningside Avenue was proposed, traversing the Brookside and Morningside Heights neighbourhoods to connect with the exurban community of Box Grove. These plans have since been canceled due to concerns that the extension would necessitate construction in a sensitive section of Rouge Park.

The low , narrow, one-lane railroad underpass at Finch Avenue, dating back to when it was a rural road, was replaced in 2009, allowing 4 lanes of traffic to pass below uninterrupted. McNicoll Avenue was later extended east terminating at a newly built extension of Morningside Avenue, while Oasis Blvd continues east of Morningside Avenue as a residential neighbourhood.

Public transit 
Morningside avenue is served by the 116 Morningside from Guildwood parkway to Nightstar road. The 133 Neilson and 53A Steeles East serves north of this to McNicoll Ave/Oasis Blvd. 53B Serves the northern part of Morningside From Passmore Ave to Steeles. The 12D, 39B, 131, 905, 939C and 953 all serve short sections, with the 905, 939C, and 953 serving express in the areas they serve.

The section between Kingston and Ellesmere has RapidTO bus lanes.

Future
Morningside Avenue is planned to be extended to Steeles Avenue (initially from Passmore Avenue to McNicoll Avenue and then to Steeles) in the future to connect to Donald Cousens Parkway via a widened Steeles Avenue. As of December 2019, the Steeles widening project is expected to start construction in 2022, and although the detailed design of the Morningside extension is expected to be completed in 2020, no schedule has been announced for the extension yet.

Attractions and points of interest
 West Hill Collegiate Institute
 Morningside Park
 Centennial HP Science and Technology Centre
 University of Toronto Scarborough on nearby Military Trail

References

External links
 Morningside Avenue at Google Maps
 Transportation Improvements in the Markham Bypass Corridor South of Highway 407 (York Region)

Roads in Toronto
Transport in Scarborough, Toronto